Warm Winds is an album by organist Charles Kynard and flautist Buddy Collette recorded in 1964 in California and released on the World Pacific label.

Reception
The Allmusic site awarded the album 3 stars.

Track listing 
All compositions by Charles Kynard except as indicated
 "Strong Breeze" - 3:07
 "Mamblues" (Cal Tjader) - 2:50
 "Blue Sands" (Buddy Collette) - 3:49
 "Warm Winds" (Tex Johnson) - 4:25
 "Cubano Chant" (Ray Bryant) - 3:35
 "Watermelon Bag" - 3:00
 "Satin Doll" (Duke Ellington) - 4:17
 "Guachi Guaro" (Chano Pozo, Dizzy Gillespie) - 5:00

Personnel 
Charles Kynard - organ 
Buddy Collette - flute
John Rae - vibraphone, timbales
Al McKibbon - bass
Doug Sides - drums
Bill Fitch - congas
Armando Peraza - congas, bongos, wido
Nick Martinez - wido, timbales

References 

1964 albums
World Pacific Records albums
Charles Kynard albums
Buddy Collette albums